Hockey Club Ak Bars, also known as Ak Bars Kazan, is a Russian professional ice hockey team based in Kazan. They are members of the Kharlamov Division of the Kontinental Hockey League.

History

Founded as Mashstroy Kazan in 1956, the name was later changed to SC Uritskogo Kazan when it entered the Soviet Class B league in 1958. It was promoted to Soviet Class A2, where it gained promotion to the top tier of Soviet hockey. Kazan's performance was respectable, starting the season by winning 6 out of 19 games against the best of the Soviet teams before falling away in the second half of the season and was demoted. Twice they won the USSR League (lower tiers), being named Champion of Russia in 1962 and 1976.

SC Uritskogo Kazan's most successful period occurred in the late 1970s and early 1980s. Following the breakup of the Soviet Union, Uritskogo Kazan became Itil Kazan in 1990 and participated in the IHL. Itil was only mildly successful, narrowly avoiding relegation to the Vysshaya Liga in 1991 and 1992.

It was following the establishment of the Russian Superleague (RSL) in 1996 that the golden age of hockey in Tatarstan began. Renamed Ak Bars Kazan after the traditional symbol of the Tatars, the snow leopard. Benefiting from the resources boom in the Urals, Ak Bars began its history in fine form, finishing first in their respective divisions in 1997 and 1998 along with winning the RSL in 1998.

In the 2004–05 season, Kazan signed 11 National Hockey League players, including Russian superstars Alexei Kovalev and Ilya Kovalchuk and Canadians Vincent Lecavalier and Dany Heatley, in an attempt to celebrate Kazan's 1000th anniversary with a championship. They did not succeed, however, as a lack of continuity and chemistry saw them finish in fourth place and were upset in the first round of the playoffs by Lokomotiv Yaroslavl. Since then, Ak Bars Kazan dominated the RSL, winning the league in 2006. In 2007, Kazan paced the league with 35 wins and 214 goals in 54 games before falling at the final hurdle to Metallurg Magnitogorsk.

Ak Bars has been led in recent years by the dominant "ZZM" line of Sergei Zinovjev, Danis Zaripov, and Aleksey Morozov, who have established themselves as one of the most dominant lines in recent history. Combined with veterans such as Vitaly Proshkin and Vladimir Vorobiev, and imports, such as Ray Giroux, Petr Čajánek, and Jukka Hentunen, Kazan has remained one of the top teams in the league. However, they have been at times criticized for lacking consistency and relying too heavily on star players such as Morozov.

Ak Bars Kazan are strong rivals with Lokomotiv Yaroslavl and the neighboring team of Salavat Yulaev Ufa. However, Ak Bars was the strongest rival with Dynamo Moscow in the 1990s.

Honors

Champions
 Russian Championship (5): 1997–98, 2005–06, 2008-09, 2009–10, 2017–18
 Gagarin Cup (3): 2008-09, 2009–10, 2017–18
 Opening Cup (2): 2009–10, 2020–21
 Russian Superleague (2): 1997–98, 2005–06
 IIHF European Champions Cup (1): 2007
 IIHF Continental Cup (1): 2007–08
 Soviet Class A2 (3): 1962, 1985, 1989 (West)
 Soviet Class B (1): 1976

Runners-up
 Russian Championship (5): 1999-00, 2001-02, 2006-07, 2014-15, 2019-20
 Gagarin Cup (1): 2014-15
 Russian Superleague (3): 1999-00, 2001-02, 2006-07
 Russian Championship (1): 2016-17
 Gagarin Cup (1): 2016-17
 Russian Superleague (1): 2003-04
 IIHF Continental Cup (1): 1999-00

Season-by-season KHL record
Note: GP = Games played; W = Wins; L = Losses; OTL = Overtime/shootout losses; Pts = Points; GF = Goals for; GA = Goals against; P = Playoff

Players

Current roster

Franchise KHL scoring leaders 

These are the top-ten point-scorers in franchise history. Figures are updated after each completed KHL regular season.

Note: Pos = Position; GP = Games played; G = Goals; A = Assists; Pts = Points; P/G = Points per game;  = current Ak Bars player

NHL alumni

 Denis Arkhipov (1995–2000)
 Dmitri Bykov (1999–2002)
 Pavel Datsyuk (2000–2001)
 Fedor Tyutin (2003–2004)
 Aleksey Morozov (2005–2013)
 Alexander Burmistrov (2008–2009, 2013–2015, 2017–2018, 2020–2022)

Head coaches

Anatoly Muravyov (1956–1965, 1966–1968)
Ismail Milushev (1965–66, 1968–1971)
Evgeny Yegorov (1971–1975)
Vladimir Andreyev (1975–1978)
Vladimir Vasiliev (1978–1982)
Oleg Golyamin (1982–1984)
Gennady Tsygurov (1984–1987)
Vitaly Stain (1987–88)
Vsevolod Yelfimov (1988–1991, 1994–95)
Yuri Ochnev (1991–92)
Vladimir Gusev (1992)
Viktor Kuznetsov (1992–94)
Yuri Moiseev (1995–1999, 2001–02)
Vladimir Krikunov (1999–01)
Vladimir Plyushev (2002–03)
Vladimír Vůjtek (2003–04)
Zinetula Bilyaletdinov (2004–2011)
Vladimir Krikunov (2011–2012)
Valery Belov (2012–2014)
Zinetula Bilyaletdinov (2014–2019)
Dmitri Kvartalnov (2019–2022)
Oleg Znarok (2022)
Yuri Babenko* (2022)
Zinetula Bilyaletdinov (2022–present)

Notable alumni

Vincent Lecavalier
Dany Heatley
Brad Richards
Robert Esche
Ilya Kovalchuk
Alexei Kovalev
Vyacheslav Kozlov
Darius Kasparaitis
Nikolai Khabibulin
Aleksey Morozov
Pavel Datsyuk
Niko Kapanen
Nik Antropov
Ruslan Salei
Michael Nylander
Jiří Hudler
Marcel Hossa

References

External links
  

 
Ice hockey teams in Russia
Kontinental Hockey League teams
Sports clubs in Kazan
1956 establishments in Russia